Otard, is a French cognac house founded in 1795 by Jean-Baptiste Antoine Otard. It was founded at the Château de Cognac, and is also sold under the name Château Royal de Cognac. Baron Otard Cognac owned by the Otard family until it was bought by the Italian company Martini & Rossi S.p.A. in 1991. Today, Baron Otard Cognac is a subsidiary of the Bacardi group.

References

External links
 Otard Cognacs

Cognac
Distilleries in France
Companies based in Nouvelle-Aquitaine